Nemacerota is a genus of moths belonging to the subfamily Thyatirinae of the Drepanidae. It was first described by George Hampson in 1893.

Species
 Nemacerota bacsovi Laszlo, G. Ronkay, L. Ronkay & Witt, 2007
 Nemacerota cinerea (Warren, 1888)
 Nemacerota decorata (Sick, 1941)
 Nemacerota griseobasalis (Sick, 1941)
 Nemacerota igorkostjuki Laszlo, G. Ronkay, L. Ronkay & Witt, 2007
 Nemacerota inouei Laszlo, G. Ronkay, L. Ronkay & Witt, 2007
 Nemacerota lobbichleri Werny, 1966
 Nemacerota mandibulata Laszlo, G. Ronkay, L. Ronkay & Witt, 2007
 Nemacerota matsumurana Laszlo, G. Ronkay, L. Ronkay & Witt, 2007
 Nemacerota owadai Laszlo, G. Ronkay, L. Ronkay & Witt, 2007
 Nemacerota pectinata (Houlbert, 1921)
 Nemacerota sejilaa Pan et al., 2014
 Nemacerota speideli Saldaitis, Ivinskis & Borth, 2014
 Nemacerota stueningi Laszlo, G. Ronkay, L. Ronkay & Witt, 2007
 Nemacerota tancrei (Graeser, 1888)
 Nemacerota taurina Laszlo, G. Ronkay, L. Ronkay & Witt, 2007

Former species
 Nemacerota alternata

References

 
 , 2007, Esperiana Buchreihe zur Entomologie Band 13: 1-683 
  et al. 2014: A new species of Nemacerota Hampson, [1893] (Lepidoptera, Thyatiridae) from Tibet, China. Zootaxa 3754
Entomofauna, Suppl. 17: 3–13.

Thyatirinae
Drepanidae genera